The New Brunswick New Democratic Party, a social democratic political party in the Canadian province of New Brunswick, held a leadership election in 1988, following the resignation of previous leader George Little after the party had been unable to win any seats in the 1987 provincial election. Robert Arthur Hall served as interim leader following Little's resignation.

Candidates
 Mona Beaulieu, payroll officer at an Edmundston Hospital and activist with the New Brunswick Federation of Labour
 Elizabeth Weir, a lawyer and former executive director of the New Brunswick NDP.

Convention
Weir had entered the convention as the sole candidate and was strongly associated with the party establishment. It was assumed heading into the convention that she was to be acclaimed. However, a rebellion over control of the party erupted with the labour movement demanding a greater say in the party. Beaulieu was put forward from the convention floor by labour delegates as a challenger to Weir and came within 5 votes of beating her.

Results

References

See also
 2005 New Brunswick New Democratic Party leadership election
 2007 New Brunswick New Democratic Party leadership election
 2011 New Brunswick New Democratic Party leadership election
 2017 New Brunswick New Democratic Party leadership election
 2021 New Brunswick New Democratic Party leadership election

1988
New Brunswick New Democratic Party leadership election
New Democratic Party leadership election
New Brunswick New Democratic Party leadership election
New Brunswick New Democratic Party leadership election